List of Rulers of the Nungu Kingdom sometimes referred to as the Gurma Kingdom or Empire.  The state was created by the Gurmanche people who are closely related to the Mossi people

This territory located in present-day Burkina Faso.

Nunbado = Ruler

See also 
Burkina Faso
Mossi states
Rulers of the Mossi state of Gurunsi
Rulers of the Mossi state of Gwiriko
Rulers of the Mossi state of Liptako
Rulers of the Mossi state of Tenkodogo
Rulers of the Mossi state of Wogodogo
Rulers of the Mossi state of Yatenga
Rulers of the Gurma Mossi state of Bilanga
Rulers of the Gurma Mossi state of Bilayanga
Rulers of the Gurma Mossi state of Bongandini
Rulers of the Gurma Mossi state of Con
Rulers of the Gurma Mossi state of Macakoali
Rulers of the Gurma Mossi state of Piela
Lists of office-holders

Beninese people
Lists of Burkinabé people
Nungu